William Morley may refer to:

Sports
Tony Morley (William Anthony Morley, born 1954), English former football player
Bill Morley (baseball) (1890–1985), Major League Baseball second baseman
Bill Morley (1876–1932), American football player

Others
William Morley (died 1597) (1531–1597), English MP for Lewes
William Morley (1606–1658), English MP for Guilford and Chester
William Morley (1653–1679), English MP for Lewes
William Morley (1666–c.1694), English MP for Arundel
Sir William Morley (1639–1701), English MP for Midhurst
William Morley (composer) (1680? –1721), English composer 
William Hook Morley (1815–1860), English barrister and orientalist
William Morley (New Zealand methodist) (1842–1926), New Zealand methodist minister and historian
William James Morley (1847–1930), English architect
William Fenton Morley (1912–), English Dean of Salisbury

Barons Morley
William de Morley, 1st  Baron Morley (died c. 1302)
William Lovel, 7th Baron Morley  (died 1476)
William Parker, 13th Baron Morley (c. 1575 – 1622)

See also